Peter Edward Reader (born 8 March 1941) is an English former football goalkeeper.

Reader was born in East Ham and played youth football for West Ham United. There, he played for the winning side in the final of the Southern Junior Floodlit Cup at Stamford Bridge on 14 October 1959 (the final had been deferred from the 1958–59 season), having shared goalkeeping duties with Frank Caskey in previous rounds.

Reader received a total of 11 caps for England at youth level, including the British Youth Championships in the 1957–58 and 1958–59 seasons.

Reader did not make a senior appearance for West Ham and was transferred to Millwall in June 1961. At Millwall, he made a single appearance, against Tranmere Rovers on 11 November 1961. Millwall lost the game 5–1. He went on to join Gravesend & Northfleet, then of the Southern League Premier Division.

References

1941 births
Living people
Footballers from East Ham
West Ham United F.C. players
Millwall F.C. players
Ebbsfleet United F.C. players
England youth international footballers
Association football goalkeepers
English Football League players
English footballers